ata football is an American over-the-top sports streaming service. The service carries live and on-demand streaming of women's football (soccer) events from various properties. Ata Football was first launched in September 2020.

The service was originally established in late 2019 by Atalanta Media, a sports media company founded by Esmeralda Negron and Hannah Brown. Negron is a former professional footballer and sports executive and Brown is a former Sky Sports rights executive.

Programming

Sports rights 
Noted sports rights held by ata football include:
 FA Women's Super League (FA WSL) - broadcast on NBC Sports in the US and DAZN in Italy and Germany as well as the atafootball.com website 
 Division 1 Feminine (D1F) - broadcast on atafootball.com website in the United States, UK, Italy and Germany; DAZN in Italy and Germany; ESPN+ and Fanatiz in the United States

See also 
 NBC Sports
 ESPN+
 DAZN

References

External links 
 

Internet television channels
Football mass media in the United Kingdom
Soccer mass media in the United States
Sports television networks in the United States
Subscription video streaming services
Internet properties established in 2019
2019 establishments in the United States
Football mass media in Germany